Jannick Schibany (born 26 April 1993) is an Austrian footballer who currently plays for First Vienna FC.

References

External links
 

1993 births
Living people
Austrian footballers
SKN St. Pölten players
First Vienna FC players
Association football forwards
People from Zwettl
Footballers from Lower Austria